Patrick Donald Rayfield OBE (born 12 February 1942, Oxford) is an English academic and Emeritus Professor of Russian and Georgian at Queen Mary University of London. He is an author of books about Russian and Georgian literature, and about Joseph Stalin and his secret police. He is also a series editor for books about Russian writers and intelligentsia. He has translated Georgian, Russian and Uzbek poets and prose writers.

Bibliography 
Dream of Lhasa: The Life of Nikolay Przhevalsky (1976)
The Cherry Orchard: Catastrophe and Comedy (1994) 
Anton Chekhov: A Life (1997)  (and several other reprints)
Understanding Chekhov: A Critical Study of Chekhov's Prose and Drama (1999)
The Garnett Book of Russian Verse (2000)
The Literature of Georgia: A History (2000)
Stalin and His Hangmen (2004)  (and several other reprints)
A Comprehensive Georgian-English Dictionary (2006)
Chekhov's Uncle Vanya and the Wood Demon (2007)
Edge of Empires: A History of Georgia (2012)

Translations from Russian 

 Dead Souls, translation of Gogol's 1842 novel (2008; 2012)
 Kolyma Stories, translation of Varlam Shalamov's stories (Vol. 1, 2018; Vol. 2, 2020)
 Lady Macbeth of Mtsensk: Selected Stories of Nikolai Leskov (2020)

Translations from Georgian
A Man Was Going Down the Road - Otar Chiladze (2012)  
Avelum - Otar Chiladze (2013) ASIN B00DG9QLZ0
The Story of My Life - Akaki Tsereteli (2013) ASIN B00COQSC7Q
Kvachi Kvachantiradze - Mikheil Javakhishvili (2015) 
Unveiling Vazha Pshavela - Vazha Pshavela, Ana Kordzaia-Samadashvili, edited by Andro Semeiko (2019)

Translations from Uzbek 

 The Devils' Dance - Hamid Ismailov (2018) - with poetry translated by John Farndon
 Manaschi - Hamid Ismailov (2021)

References 

"A Man was Going Down the Road"

1942 births
Living people
Linguists from the United Kingdom
Kartvelian studies scholars
Academics of Queen Mary University of London
Translators from Georgian
Historians of Georgia (country)
Georgian–English translators